WCMF-FM (96.5 MHz) is a radio station located in the Rochester, New York, area. Its transmitter is located on Pinnacle Hill in Brighton, Monroe County, and its studios are located at High Falls Studios in downtown Rochester.

WCMF is a heritage classic rock station in the Rochester area.

The current WCMF morning show is now called The Break Room and features Tommy Mulé, Pat Duffy and Kimmy Bernston, with the latter fulfilling the producer role, with traffic reporting by a rotating cast. Long time co-host Sally Carpenter left the show in September 2009. She had been broadcasting remotely from Philadelphia and did not renew her contract, due to the stipulation that she move back to Rochester.

The Program Director and midday host, Dave Kane, returned to the station in February 2008 after Brother Wease's departure. Kane, commonly referred to as "Kane-O", retired in 2022.

In 2012, WCMF became one of two Buffalo Bills radio affiliates in Rochester, the other being sister station WROC.

WCMF and WROC are affiliates of the Sabres Hockey Network.

The station is currently owned by Audacy, Inc. (formerly Entercom Communications), which purchased it and several other stations from CBS Radio on November 30, 2007.

History

WCMF was originally owned by Community Music Service, Inc., hence the "CM" in its call letters. In 1968, the station was owned by a handful of Rochester locals. Several were engineers at General Dynamics, including a lawyer from Harris Beech Wilcox. The station had a mish-mash of formats from Candlelight & Wine in the morning hosted by Bill Rund, to hard underground rock hosted by Bob Drake (Francati). On Friday evening, a local attorney hosted a very popular jazz show. The owners were not broadcasters and the station was searching for identity. In 1968, everything changed when the morning personality left. Drake, then program director, hired a young black DJ, Herb Hamlett, who had briefly worked at the big R&B station WUFO in Buffalo, but was tired of the commute. Hamlett took the morning slot, supposedly to play light classics, with a show called Sunup in Stereo. Realizing that the owners were not hands-on, he soon turned up the heat and started mixing in R&B, which was fine with the then GM Bill Bennett. Hamlett soon began going out and selling the time himself and was promoted to sales manager. He and Drake soon realized the emergence of a major coup, and split the format into R&B from 6a.m. to 3p.m. and underground rock from 3p.m. to sign off at midnight.

Even with this success, Drake continued to lock horns with the owners, and left in 1970 to take a position with Marine Midland Bank. He was replaced by a handful of personalities, including Bill Ardis from WHAM, the 24-hour gestation. Ardis picked up where Drake left off, and along with Hamlett, turned the station into a basic two-format power "Soul and Underground" in 1971. Hamlett made a major mistake and tried to make a backdoor purchase of the station. He took what he thought were sufficient proxies to swing a majority of the stockholders, but was defeated when one of them switched at the stockholders' meeting. Hamlett left in 1971 and a new GM, Jim Trayhearn, was brought in and was successful in putting together a buyout of the old Community Music Service stockholders to create a marketable 24-hour underground rock format. R&B WDKX FM, which was formed in 1974, unofficially took over Rochester's R&B music scene.

Hamlett teamed up with his two former WUFO colleagues, Frankie Crocker and Eddie O'Jay, and began managing and promoting R&B groups. In 1974, He joined the telecom company AT&T.

References

External links

HD Radio stations
CMF-FM
Classic rock radio stations in the United States
Audacy, Inc. radio stations
Radio stations established in 1960
1960 establishments in New York (state)